Isaias Gamboa (born April 21, 1963) is an Afro-Costa Rican-American music producer, songwriter, musician, arranger, author and filmmaker. Born in San Jose, Costa Rica to parents of Spanish and Afro-Caribbean ancestry. His mother, Carmen Gamboa Beckles, was born in the coastal Costa Rican city of Puerto Limon, and his father, Danilo Gamboa Mora, born in the interior province of San Ramón, Costa Rica.

Gamboa has written, performed, produced and or arranged more than 200 songs for recording artists including, Shalamar, Gladys Knight & the Pips, Tavares, The Brothers Johnson, Dynasty, The Pointer Sisters, and five albums for Rock and Roll Hall of Fame recording artists The Temptations. Three of these include, For Lovers Only, Phoenix Rising, which received a Platinum certification, and the Grammy Award winning CD Ear-Resistible, which won the 2001 Grammy Award for Best Traditional R&B Performance. In 1994. Gamboa produced the remix of "Pain" by the late, Tupac Shakur for the Multi-Platinum, Above the Rim

Isaias Gamboa grew up during the 1960s and 70s in the primarily African American community of West Adams, Los Angeles. He was first introduced to the piano by his mother at age 5, and by age 11, played several musical instruments.  In the early '70s, he was taught to play the guitar by noted Jump blues guitarist, Edgar Rice of the Alexander Nelson Trio, and under Rice's tutelage, learned Honkey tonk guitar and a particular style of West Coast blues called, Jump blues. At the age of 13, Gamboa accompanied Los Angeles-based Blues singer, Ernie Andrews on the blues guitar, at an outdoor event in Los Angeles. In 1980, at age 17, Isaias was introduced by pop singer, Foster Sylvers to his older brother, R&B music producer Leon Sylvers III, who signed him to his music production and music publishing companies. While still in his teens, Gamboa was signed by music industry executive, Clive Davis as a member of the 1980s R&B band, Real To Reel (Arista Records). Notably, five-time Grammy Award-winning music producers, Jimmy Jam and Terry Lewis, after having met Leon Sylvers III at a celebrity basketball game in Los Angeles, produced their first-ever professional recordings; "Can You Treat Me Like She Does", and "Don't Keep Me Hangin' On" for Gamboa's band, Real To Reel. Sylvers produced the rest of the album. 

Isaias Gamboa was also a founding member of the 1990s neoclassical R&B singing group, "Double Action Theatre" (Polydor Records, which he also produced. ). In the 1990s, Gamboa was discovered by music producer, Richard Perry, who mentored him, and with whom he worked closely with on For Lovers Only.

In June 2010, Gamboa released a solo CD entitled, "Don't Lie To Me". Featuring his own vocal and instrumental performances. The 12 song collection was written, produced, performed and arranged by himself. The CD also includes performances by famed guitarist, Larry Carlton, The Temptations; drummer, Trevor Lawrence Jr., singer, Vida Jafari and saxophonist, Donald Hayes.

Gamboa is a licensed Christian minister. His mother was a Baptist and his father, Catholic. He also strongly identifies with his Jewish ancestry through his Jamaican maternal grandmother, Louise Teitelbaum. This background is written about in Gamboa's 2012 book, We Shall Overcome: Sacred Song On The Devil's Tongue.

Published in 2012, We Shall Overcome: Sacred Song On The Devil's Tongue tells the previously undocumented history of the protest anthem, We Shall Overcome, and is also the biography of Louise Shropshire (1913-1993). According to evidence revealed in Gamboa's book, Shropshire - a hymn writer, civil rights activist and close friend of the Reverend Doctor Martin Luther King Jr., Rev. Fred Shuttlesworth and Rev. Thomas A. Dorsey, played an important role in the creation of the iconic freedom anthem, "We Shall Overcome." The song, popularized by Pete Seeger and others, has been credited to "Unknown" for more than half a century. Newly-discovered facts presented in Gamboa's book, trace Shropshire's uncredited involvement with the freedom standard to her hymn, "If My Jesus Wills", more commonly known as "I'll Overcome" from which prima facie and other evidence indicates "We Shall Overcome" was derived. The book was featured at the Author's Pavilion at the 2015 NAACP National Convention. An abridged, dramatized audiobook version of the book, also named, We Shall Overcome: Sacred Song On The Devil's Tongue was released on Plum Recordings in 2011. Narrated and produced by, Isaias Gamboa on his own music label, the four-hour collection also features slave narratives and negro spirituals.
 

Through the efforts of, Dr. P. Eric Abercrumbie, Director of Ethnic Programs and Services and the African American Culture and Resource Center at the University of Cincinnati, Louise Shropshire's papers and artifacts were acquired in 2014 by the University of Cincinnati and are preserved in the Rare Books Archives.

According to the University of Cincinnati, The Louise Shropshire Family Papers collection includes photographs, family memorabilia, letters, sheet music and other documents.  The collection is held in UC's Archives and Rare Books Library, located on the eighth floor of Blegen Library. 

In September of 2010, Gamboa began producing and directing a documentary film, which would track his real-time journey of discovery into the true origins of We Shall Overcome. The film was originally scheduled to be completed by fall 2015, that is until The Richmond Organization,the music publishing company that claimed rights to the song, informed Gamboa that he would not be able to use the song in his film. On April 12, 2016, the We Shall Overcome Foundation (WSOF), a non-profit organization founded and led by Gamboa, filed a lawsuit seeking clarification of the copyright status of "We Shall Overcome". The Richmond Organization and Ludlow Music (TRO-Ludlow) had asserted copyright on the song based on copyrights registered in 1960 and 1963, but the suit alleged that only specific arrangements and that a version published in 1948 under the title "We Will Overcome" had expired due to lack of renewal. In September 2017, a judge issued an opinion that there were insignificant differences between the first verses of the 1948 and registered versions for copyright to exist in it.

On January 26, 2018, Judge Denise Cote of the Southern District of New York filed an order in which Ludlow Music and The Richmond Organization—the defendants in the lawsuit—agreed to a settlement stipulating: "Defendants agree that hereafter they will not claim copyright in the melody or lyrics of any verse of the song We Shall Overcome ("the Song"), included in the registration Nos. EU645288 (1960) and EP 179877 (1963). Defendants agree that the melody and lyrics of those verses of the Song are hereafter dedicated to the public domain".

References

1963 births
Living people
People from San José, Costa Rica
Costa Rican musicians
Costa Rican male writers
People from West Adams, Los Angeles